Queen Street light rail station is situated on the corner of Wardoo Street and Queen Street in the Gold Coast suburb of Southport. The station is part of the Gold Coast's G:link light rail network and services the local residential community that surrounds the station. Translink provides an integrated public transport network for the whole of South East Queensland and is responsible for ticketing and timetables, Queen Street station falls in zone 5 of the network.

The station is a central platform station, meaning that both north and southbound platforms are located in the middle, with tracks either side. The station itself sits in the middle of Queen Street, with traffic running either side of the platform. A ramp is located at the western end of the platform, with a signalised pedestrian crossing to either side of the road from that point. All stations on the G:link network are wheelchair accessible.

Location 
Queen Street light rail station is located on the corner of Queen Street and Wardoo Street on the eastern side of Southport. Situated largely in a residental area the station also services the Southport General Cemetery, Southport State School  and a light industrial estate to the west of the station. The station provides no transport links.{
  "type": "FeatureCollection",
  "features": [
    {
      "type": "Feature",
      "properties": {},
      "geometry": {
        "type": "Point",
        "coordinates": [
          153.3945274347207,
          -27.97018089186588
        ]
      }
    }
  ]
}

External links
 G:link

References 

G:link stations
Railway stations in Australia opened in 2014
Southport, Queensland